Adipati Koesmadji or better known as Adipati Dolken (born in Tangerang, Banten, Indonesia on August 19, 1991) is an Indonesian actor and model of mixed German and Javanese descent.

Career
Adipati gained prominence when he appeared in a supporting role on the soap opera  (Indonesian: Cocoon), which aired on SCTV from 2008 to 2009.

In 2012, he starred along with Maudy Ayunda and Surya Saputra in Malaikat Tanpa Sayap (Indonesian: An Angel with No Wings). It was released in August. In December the same year, its  was released, with Adipati reprising his role.

In 2013, he appeared in the historical film The Clerics, where his performance garnered him the Citra Award for Best Supporting Actor at the 2013 Indonesian Film Festival. At the age of 22, he was one of the youngest award recipients at the festival.

In 2017, he starred in two drama films;  (Indonesian: Sacrifice) and Posesif (Indonesian: Possessive), the latter landed him a nomination for the Citra Award for Best Leading Actor at the 2017 Indonesian Film Festival.

Adipati was cast in the film, which was shot in Aceh, alongside fellow Indonesian actress Sekar Sari and Japanese actors Dean Fujioka, Mayu Tsuruta and Taiga.

Personal life
Adipati was born in Ciputat, Tangerang Banten, Indonesia. He has mixed German and Javanese ancestry. During his early career he was credited as Adipati Koesmadji, his birth name. While on vacation in Puncak he decided to adopt a stage name, choosing Dolken, the name of the Dutch owner of the villa where he was staying.

Adipati is a GATSBY Indonesia brand ambassador.

Filmography
Sources:

Film

Television
 
 Kejora dan Bintang
 
 
 
 Heart Series 2
 
 The Publicist
 Alphabet

Awards and nominations

References

External links
 

1991 births
Living people
Citra Award winners
Indonesian male film actors
Indonesian male television actors
Indonesian people of German descent
Indo people
Javanese people
People from Bandung